Yasser Borhami is an Egyptian Salafi Muslim activist and preacher. He is one of the founders of the Salafist Call, a movement that created the Salafist Al Nour Party in 2011. He is also the vice president of the Salafist Call. Borhamy was detained for a month in 1987 due to his alleged connection with the assassination attempt against interior minister Hassan Abu Basha by the group Salvation from Hell.

See also
 Nilesat
 List of Da'is

References

External links 
http://www.islamway.com/?iw_s=Scholar&iw_a=info&scholar_id=96

1958 births
Living people
Politicians from Alexandria
Egyptian religious leaders
Egyptian television personalities
Egyptian Salafis
Egyptian Muslims